The Romance for violin and orchestra No. 1 in G major, Op. 40, was composed by Ludwig van Beethoven, one of two such compositions, the other being Romance No. 2 in F major, Op. 50. It was written about 1801, after the second Romance, and was published 1803, two years before the publication of the second. Thus, this romance was designated as Beethoven's first.

The Romance, Op. 40, is scored for violin solo and an orchestra of strings, two oboes, two bassoons, two horns and flute. The duration is about 8 minutes.

The unaccompanied opening bars for the solo violin

References

External links 
 

 , David Oistrakh, Moscow Radio Symphony Orchestra, conducted by Gennady Rozhdestvensky, Moscow 1966

Compositions by Ludwig van Beethoven
Compositions for violin and orchestra
1802 compositions
Compositions in G major
Romance (music)